Klobuchar is a surname, originating from the Croatian and Slovene language surname Klobučar.

People with this surname include:

 Amy Klobuchar (born 1960), United States Senator and 2020 presidential candidate
 Anna Klobuchar Clemenc (1888–1956), American labor activist
 Jim Klobuchar (1928–2021; father of Amy), American journalist, author, and travel guide

See also
Klobučar (disambiguation)

Slovene-language surnames